Scheidplatz is a Munich U-Bahn interchange station in the borough of Schwabing-West.

References

External links

Munich U-Bahn stations
Railway stations in Germany opened in 1972
1972 establishments in West Germany